Zetheumenidion is a small afrotropical genus of potter wasps currently containing 5 species, one of them with two recognized subspecies. The species are distributed through southern and eastern Africa.

References

 Carpenter, J.M., J. Gusenleitner & M. Madl. 2010. A Catalogue of the Eumeninae (Hymenoptera: Vespidae) of the Ethiopian Region excluding Malagasy Subregion. Part II: Genera Delta de Saussure 1885 to Zethus Fabricius 1804 and Species Incertae Sedis. Linzer Biologische Beiträge 42 (1) : 95 - 315.

Hymenoptera genera
Potter wasps